The Biblioteca Civica (est. 1760) of Bergamo, Italy, is a public library founded by Giuseppe Alessandro Furietti.

References

Bibliography
in English
  1977?
 

in Italian
  (Exhibit catalog)

External links

 Official site

Libraries in Bergamo
Bergamo
1760 establishments in Italy
Libraries established in 1760